Darjuš Lavrinovič (born 1 November 1979) is a Lithuanian professional basketball player for the BC Vytis of the National Basketball League. He is 2.12m (6' 11½") in height. He plays the center position. He is also a member of the Lithuanian national basketball team. Lavrinovič was an All-EuroLeague Second Team selection in 2006.

Professional career
Darjuš Lavrinovič blossomed in the EuroLeague 2005–06 season while playing with Žalgiris Kaunas, as he earned an All-EuroLeague Second Team selection. He was a rebounding monster that year, claiming the league rebounding crown in both the LKL and the Baltic League, averaging 9.8 rebounds per game in each competition. He joined Real Madrid in 2009. The following year, he was transferred to Fenerbahçe. In 2011, he signed a two-year contract with CSKA Moscow.

On 30 August 2013 he signed with Budivelnyk Kyiv.

On 31 July 2014 Darjuš officially joined Grissin Bon Reggio Emilia in the Italian Serie A. Despite missing the start of the season because of an injury, he contributed 11.4 points in around 17 minutes per game over 25 league games, before scoring in double figures in 10 of 15 playoff games he played in as Reggio Emilia only conceded the title on game 7 of the finals to Game 7 of the Italian League finals.

On 22 August 2018 Lavrinovič signed with BC Prienai of the Lithuanian Basketball League.

On 21 September 2019 he signed with the London City Royals of the British Basketball League.

On 19 January 2020 he signed with BC Vytis of the National Basketball League.

National team career
Lavrinovič has also been a member of the senior Lithuanian national basketball team. With Lithuania's national team he has played at the EuroBasket 2005, the 2006 FIBA World Championship, the EuroBasket 2007, the 2008 Summer Olympics, the EuroBasket 2009, the EuroBasket 2013 and the 2014 FIBA World Cup. He helped Lithuania win the silver medal at the EuroBasket 2013 and the bronze medal at the EuroBasket 2007.

Personal life
Lavrinovič is ethnically Polish. Lavrinovič has a twin-brother, Kšyštof, whom he played with at UNICS Kazan in the Russian Superleague, as well as with on the senior men's Lithuanian national basketball team.
On 18 October 1998 Darjuš Lavrinovič, his twin-brother Kšyštof and their cousin raped at that time a seventeen-year-old girl. On 25 June 1999 the court sentenced the twin brothers to 5 years in prison and the cousin to 6 years in prison.

Career statistics

EuroLeague

|-
| style="text-align:left;"|2003–04
| style="text-align:left;"|Žalgiris
| 2 || 1 || 17.5 || .571 || .333 || 1.000 || 2.5 || 1.0 || .0 || 1.5 || 11.5 || 12.5
|-
| style="text-align:left;"|2004–05
| style="text-align:left;"|Žalgiris
| 14 || 2 || 15.3 || .536 || .316 || .692 || 4.1 || .1 || .4 || 1.4 || 7.0 || 8.1
|-
| style="text-align:left;"|2005–06
| style="text-align:left;"|Žalgiris
| 20 || 15 || 27.3 || .516 || .379 || .681 || 8.3 || 1.9 || .8 || style="background:#CFECEC;"| 2.1 || 14.7 || 18.7
|-
| style="text-align:left;"|2009–10
| style="text-align:left;"|Real Madrid
| 20 || 10 || 20.0 || .577 || .412 || .739 || 4.5 || 1.2 || 1.0 || .9 || 11.1 || 14.5
|-
| style="text-align:left;"|2010–11
| style="text-align:left;"|Fenerbahçe
| 16 || 16 || 21.7 || .426 || .226 || .778 || 4.4 || 1.3 || .8 || .9 || 8.0 || 9.6
|-
| style="text-align:left;"|2011–12
| style="text-align:left;"|CSKA
| 15 || 1 || 12.4 || .434 || .300 || .857 || 2.7 || .5 || .5 || .3 || 4.7 || 4.5
|-
| style="text-align:left;"|2012–13
| style="text-align:left;"|Žalgiris
| 21 || 10 || 19.7 || .511 || .333 || .707 || 3.8 || 1.0 || .7 || .4 || 8.9 || 9.9
|-
| style="text-align:left;"|2013–14
| style="text-align:left;"|Budivelnyk
| 10 || 10 || 30.0 || .557 || .406 || .882 || 5.4 || 1.8 || 1.0 || 1.4 || 15.1 || 19.5
|- class="sortbottom"
| style="text-align:left;" colspan="2"|Career
| 118 || 67 || 20.8 || .516 || .342 || .751 || 4.8 || 1.2 || .7 || 1.0 || 10.0 || 12.0

Honours

Individual
All-EuroLeague Team
Second Team: 2005–06 
Lithuanian League All-Star Game:
MVP: 2013
Ukrainian SuperLeague
MVP: 2013–14
Ukrainian Cup
MVP: 2014
All-EuroCup Team
Second Team: 2013–14

Team

International
EuroBasket
2007 Spain: 
2013 Slovenia:

Club
Lithuanian League
Champion: 2004, 2005, 2013
Baltic Basketball League
Champion: 2005
Turkish Super League
Champion: 2011
Turkish Cup
Winner: 2011
VTB United League
Champion: 2012
Russian PBL
Champion: 2012
Champion: 2012
Ukrainian SuperLeague
Champion: 2014
Ukrainian Cup
Winner: 2014

References

External links
 Euroleague.net Profile
 Spanish League Profile 

1979 births
Living people
2006 FIBA World Championship players
2014 FIBA Basketball World Cup players
Basketball players at the 2008 Summer Olympics
BC Budivelnyk players
BC Dynamo Moscow players
BC Lietkabelis players
BC UNICS players
BC Žalgiris players
Centers (basketball)
Fenerbahçe men's basketball players
Lega Basket Serie A players
Liga ACB players
Lithuanian expatriate basketball people in Italy
Lithuanian expatriate basketball people in Spain
Lithuanian expatriate basketball people in Russia
Lithuanian expatriate basketball people in Turkey
Lithuanian expatriate basketball people in Ukraine
Lithuanian men's basketball players
Lithuanian people of Polish descent
Olympic basketball players of Lithuania
Pallacanestro Reggiana players
PBC CSKA Moscow players
Power forwards (basketball)
Real Madrid Baloncesto players
Basketball players from Vilnius
Lithuanian twins
Twin sportspeople
London City Royals players